A list of French-produced and co-produced films scheduled for release in 2022. When applicable, the domestic theatrical release date is favoured.

Films

Notes

External links
 French films of 2022 at the Internet Movie Database

Lists of 2022 films by country or language
2022
Films